The 4th IAAF World Athletics Final was held at the Gottlieb-Daimler-Stadion in Stuttgart, Germany on September 9 and September 10, 2006.

Results

Men

Women

References

External links
Official 4th IAAF World Athletics Final Site

World Athletics Final
Sports competitions in Stuttgart
International athletics competitions hosted by Germany
IAAF World Athletics Final
2000s in Baden-Württemberg